The 2018–19 Elitserien was the twelfth season of the present highest Swedish men's bandy top division, Elitserien.

Teams

* – indoor arena

League table

Results
Teams play each other twice, once at home and once away.

Top scorers

Knock-out stage

Preliminary round

|}

Broberg/Söderhamn IF vs IFK Vänersborg
				
		

IFK Vänersborg won 7–6 on aggregate.

IFK Motala vs Vetlanda BK
				
		

IFK Motala won 11–5 on aggregate.

Bracket

Quarter-finals

Västerås SK vs IFK Vänersborg
	

Västerås SK won the tie 3–1.

Sandvikens AIK vs Hammarby IF
				
				
				
				

Hammarby IF won the tie 3–2.

Villa Lidköping BK vs IFK Motala
				
				

Villa Lidköping BK won the tie 3–0.

Edsbyns IF vs Bollnäs GIF
				
				

Edsbyns IF won the tie 3–0.

Semi-finals

Västerås SK vs Hammarby IF

Västerås SK won the tie 3–0.

Villa Lidköping BK vs Edsbyns IF

Villa Lidköping BK won the tie 3–0.

Final

Relegation playoffs

References

Elitserien (bandy) seasons
bandy
bandy
Elitserien
Elitserien